Keisei may refer to:

Keisei (monk)
Keisei Electric Railway
Keisei Bus